Wolfgang Kautek is an Austrian Physical chemist and the head of the Physical chemistry department at the University of Vienna.

He is the President of the Erwin Schrödinger Society for Nanosciences (ESG) and the Chairman of the Research Group "Physical Chemistry" at the Austrian Chemical Society (GÖCh).

References

Physical chemists
Austrian chemists
Academic staff of the University of Vienna
Living people
Austrian physical chemists
Laser researchers
1953 births